Roberto Campos (1902 – death unknown) was a Cuban outfielder in the Negro leagues and Cuban League in the 1920s.

A native of Manzanillo, Cuba, Campos played in the Negro leagues for the Cuban Stars (West) in 1923. He also played in the Cuban League for the Habana club in 1923–1924.

References

External links
 and Baseball-Reference Black Baseball stats and Seamheads

1902 births
Date of birth missing
Year of death missing
Place of birth missing
Place of death missing
Cuban Stars (West) players
Habana players
People from Manzanillo, Cuba